Microbacterium luticocti is a Gram-positive, short rod and motile bacterium from the genus Microbacterium which has been isolated from sewage sludge compost in Porto in Portugal.

References

Further reading

External links
Type strain of Microbacterium luticocti at BacDive -  the Bacterial Diversity Metadatabase	

Bacteria described in 2008
luticocti